The 1982-83 Georgia Tech Yellow Jackets men's basketball team represented the Georgia Institute of Technology. Led by head coach Bobby Cremins, the team finished the season with an overall record of 13-15 (4-10 ACC).

Roster

Schedule and results 

|-
!colspan=9 style=| Regular Season

|-
!colspan=9 style=| ACC Tournament

References 

Georgia Tech Yellow Jackets men's basketball seasons
Georgia Tech
1982 in sports in Georgia (U.S. state)
1983 in sports in Georgia (U.S. state)